William Edward Baker (11 May 1892 – 1980) was a professional footballer who played as an outside left in the Football League for Plymouth Argyle and Derby County.

Personal life 
Baker served during the First World War and was wounded and gassed.

Career statistics

Honours 
Derby County

 Football League Second Division: 1914–15

References 

English footballers
English Football League players
Place of death missing
1892 births
Footballers from Woolwich
1980 deaths
British Army personnel of World War I
Association football outside forwards
Derby County F.C. players
Plymouth Argyle F.C. players
Northfleet United F.C. players
Queens Park Rangers F.C. players
Dartford F.C. players